Rodrigo Massa (born March 26, 1989, São Bernardo do Campo, São Paulo), is a Brazilian actor, singer and TV Host who lives and works in Mexico City. He is currently playing the role of agent Aldo Tapia in the action-packed TV show La Piloto and as of September he will be starring as Richie Comanche on Like, a new teen drama television series, both developed by Televisa, the world's biggest Spanish-speaking entertainment network, Televisa.

Biography 
At age 20, after studying four semesters of Linguistics at the University of São Paulo, he decided to leave his studies and his work as a teacher of languages and move to Mexico to try his luck in the show business. His artistic career began in 2007, when he made his first appearances in TV commercials. After graduating from CEA (the acting school that belongs to Mexican TV Network Televisa), where he studied acting, singing, TV hosting and dancing, he participated in more than 150 advertising campaigns in Mexico, El Salvador, Honduras, Guatemala, Uruguay and United States, making him one of the most sought after faces of Latin American advertisement.

In 2012 he was offered his first opportunity as a TV presenter, hosting the music show México Suena, also on Televisa. He went on to host a great number of shows with themes that ranged from sports (Tú Diriges – Televisa) to fashion (Elle México Diseña – E! Entertainment Television), kids (1 2 3 Clic – Televisa), lifestyle (Zona Trendy – E! Entertainment Television), electronic music (Latin Stage – Ritmoson Latino), travel (Top Five – TLC (TV network)), home shopping (CJ Group) and many others.

As for his acting career, in 2013 he played an FBI agent in the highest-grossing Mexican film of all time Instructions Not Included. He landed his first major role in a TV show in 2014, giving life to Amador Zúñiga on The Color of Passion, produced by Televisa and distributed around the world in over 50 countries. Another opportunity came in 2015 with the premiere of Un Mal Date on Latin American digital platform blim, where he played Omar Santiago, a cheating boyfriend who became a huge disappointment to Laya, played by Mexican popstar Ximena Sariñana.

In 2016, Rodrigo signed a two-year contract with Ocesa Teatro which led to his first theater play Verdad o Reto (Truth or Dare), a musical tribute to the 90s, where he played the lead role Pepe for two seasons. His second theater challenge, one year later, was the role of Juan Ramón in the British comic opera Iolanthe, which had an entire sold-out season at the National Arts Center in Mexico City. It's worth mentioning that not a single person in the all-male cast consisting of 32 actors had an understudy during the entire season. But his biggest theater success was yet to come: Mentiras el musical, the longest-running musical in the history of Latin American theater – 10 years of uninterrupted performances. Rodrigo was hired in early 2017 to play the only male part in the musical: Emmanuel, being witness to two of the play's most important celebrations – the 3000-performance mark and the one-million-viewer record.

In February 2018 he announced the release of his first single "Acabo de Soñar Contigo" with a double launch on digital platforms, both in Spanish and in his mother tongue Portuguese. The single was followed by a very controversial music video due to its shocking plot twist which reveals a homosexual romance towards the end, portrayed by Italian-Venezuelan model Fabrizio Sassano and Rodrigo Massa himself. The passionate gay kiss led to speculation over Rodrigo's sexual orientation. However, even though the gay community throughout Latin America has praised his decision and congratulated him on his outing he hasn't confirmed or denied anything.

Filmography

References

External links

1991 births
Brazilian male telenovela actors
Living people
21st-century Brazilian male actors
Brazilian male television actors
21st-century Brazilian male singers
21st-century Brazilian singers